Hurricane Joanne was one of four tropical cyclones to bring gale-force winds to the Southwestern United States in the 20th century. A tropical depression developed on September 30, 1972. It then moved west northwest and intensified into a hurricane on October 1. Hurricane Joanne peaked as a Category 2 hurricane, as measured by the modern Saffir-Simpson hurricane wind scale (SSHWS), October 2. Joanne then slowed and began to re-curve. Joanne made landfall along the northern portion of the Baja California Peninsula as a tropical storm. The tropical storm moved inland over Sonora on October 6 and was believed to have survived into Arizona as a tropical storm. In Arizona, many roads were closed and some water rescues had to be performed due to a prolonged period of heavy rains. One person was reportedly killed while another was electrocuted. A few weeks after the hurricane, Arizona would sustain additional flooding and eight additional deaths.

Meteorological history

During September 27 and September 28, the disturbance moved westward. On September 29, the disturbance developed a closed low-level atmospheric circulation. On October 2, the EPHC classified Joanne as a Category 2 system on the Saffir-Simpson Scale.

Later that day, the Eastern Pacific Hurricane Center (EPHC) downgraded Joanne into a tropical storm as the system weakened. Accelerating north and later northeast, Joanne made landfall near Laguna Chapala on Baja California while a tropical storm late on October 5 and moved inland over Sonora on the next day. At the time of its second landfall, the EPHC suddenly stopped tracking the storm altogether, although the Weather Prediction Center believes that Joanne moved northeast into western Pima County while still a minimal tropical storm. Thereafter, Joanne was estimated to have weakened to a depression near Ajo and dissipated near Flagstaff.

Impact

The initial disturbance to Joanne brought squally weather to Guatemala. Further north, Joanne caused heavy surf in California, and brought tropical storm-force winds to the state.

Prior to landfall, flash flood watches were issued for the southern portion of the state. Heavy rainfall was reported throughout Arizona. Over  was measured at the Mogollon Rim. The Nogales Highway Bridge over the Santa Cruz River was washed away by the flooding. Some secondary roads near Tucson were flooded. Numerous water rescues were conducted in central Tucson since several major streets turned into rivers. Severe flooding was recorded in Clifton, Duncan, and Safford. An official in Maricopa County lost track on the exact number of roads that were closed because of the hurricane. Many neighborhoods in northern Phoenix were evacuated early on October 7 when a canal overflowed its banks due to prolonged rainfall. Downtown, a young man was electrocuted when he tried to remove a downed power line that was on his car. One person was also killed in the city. Following the storm, heavy rain from Joanne set the stage for additional flooding in mid-to late October from a Gulf of Alaska extratropical cyclone that brought more moisture to the area, causing $10 million (1972 USD) in property damage and eight deaths. Further west in New Mexico, the hurricane produced  of precipitation.

Hurricane Joanne was one of only four known Pacific hurricanes to bring gale-force winds to the Continental United States in the 20th century, and was the first since the 1939 California tropical storm. According to the National Weather Service, it was the first time in recorded history that a tropical cyclone had brought gale-force winds to Arizona.

See also
1939 California tropical storm
Hurricane Kathleen (1976)
Hurricane Nora (1997)
Hurricane Rosa (2018)

References

Joanne (1972)
1972 in Mexico
1972 natural disasters in the United States
Joanne (1972)
Hurricanes in Baja California
Hurricanes in Baja California Sur
Hurricanes in Arizona
Hurricanes in California
Hurricanes in New Mexico
Hurricanes in Sonora